The men's 4 x 200 metre freestyle relay competition at the 2014 South American Games took place on March 8 at the Estadio Nacional. The last champion was Venezuela.

This race consisted of sixteen lengths of the pool. Each of the four swimmers completed four lengths of the pool. The first swimmer had to touch the wall before the second could leave the starting block.

Records
Prior to this competition, the existing world and Pan Pacific records were as follows:

Results
All times are in minutes and seconds.

Heats
Heats weren't performed, as only six teams had entered.

Final 
The final was held on March 8, at 20:12.

References

Swimming at the 2014 South American Games